The Falklands Naval Station was the main base of the naval component of Argentina in the Falklands Islands (or Malvinas  Islands), during the South Atlantic conflict of 1982.

History 

The Falklands Naval Station was a naval port facility of the Argentine Navy, established on April 2, 1982 by the Sea Fleet Command; having been located in the town of Port Stanley , the main port and population center of the Falklands Islands. The unit was established in the buildings near the East Pier of Port Stanley, although part of the staff was also commissioned to other places in the capital and the rest of the archipelago.  The first and only commanding officer was frigate captain Adolfo Aurelio Gaffoglio and the unit was dissolved de facto with the end of the 1982 conflict.

Initially, its purpose was to provide logistical support to the naval units operating in the Falklands but as the Falklands War developed, its activities extended to undertake missions of all kinds. Argentina had not been in a war since the 19th Century and as a result, the force marked a number of milestones in the history of Argentina´s Naval Force, including the anchoring of  naval mines and the launch of Exocet MM-38 missiles in a coastal defence role using an improvised launcher.

Sailors from the command were tasked with manning the small coastal craft seized from the Falkland Islands Government and  Falkland Islands Company.  On 1 May 1982, Islas Malvinas GC82, an Argentine Z-28 type naval patrol boat was damaged near the Kidney Island by a Westland Lynx HAS.Mk.2/3 helicopter from HMS Alacrity, the British helicopter (XZ720) was also damaged by fire from the armed coaster Forrest. During a mission carried out by Monsunen  to resupply the garrison at Port Stanley from Fox Bay, the small Argentine vessel was engaged by British naval and air forces during the Battle of Seal Cove.  Although compelled to temporarily abandon the ship when it ran aground, it refloated on the incoming tide and with assistance from the Forest they were able to complete the resupply trip.  In the closing moments of the war, seamen from the unit were deployed as infantry supporting the Argentine marines and engaged the SBS and SAS during the diversionary raid on Port Stanley Harbour.

Ships

The ships stationed at this base included: 

 ARA Bahía Buen Suceso
 ARA Isla de los Estados
 ELMA Formosa
 ELMA Río Carcarañá
 Yehuín
 Forrest
 Monsunen
 Penélope
 PNA Islas Malvinas
 PNA Río Iguazú

In addition, there was a small unit known as the "Boat Group", which manned the tugboat Lively, two EDPV-type landing craft and a barge used for refuelling.

See also 
 Battle of Seal Cove
 Raid on Cortley Ridge
 Empresa Líneas Marítimas Argentinas (ELMA)

External Links 

 Westland Lynx (XZ720) preserved in the Fleet Air Arm Museum
 El Apostadero Naval Malvinas en Internet, the website of the Veterans of the Falklands Naval Station (Spanish)
 La "unidad olvidada" de la Guerra de Malvinas, article about the unit and its members, by Loreley Gaffoglio (Spanish)
 Armada Argentina (Spanish)

Citations

References

Argentine Navy bases
 
1982 in Argentina
Military units and formations of Argentina in the Falklands War
1982 establishments in the Falkland Islands